Andreas Pantazis (born 4 June 2000) is a Greek triple jumper who represented Greece at the 2019 European Under-20 Championships, taking the third place.

Competition record

References

External links

2000 births
Living people
Greek male triple jumpers